This is a list of awards and nominations for awards received by the rock band Van Halen.

Van Halen is a hard rock band formed in Pasadena, California in 1972 and consisted of Eddie Van Halen on guitar, keyboards, and vocals, Alex Van Halen on drums and percussion, Michael Anthony on bass and vocals, and David Lee Roth on lead vocals. They enjoyed success from the release of their self-titled debut album in 1978. As of 2007 Van Halen has sold more than 80 million albums worldwide] and have had the most number one hits on the Billboard Mainstream Rock chart. During the 1980s they also had more Billboard Hot 100 hits than any other hard rock or heavy metal band. According to the Recording Industry Association of America, Van Halen is the 19th best selling band/artist of all time with sales of over 56 million albums in the United States and is one of five rock bands that have had two albums sell more than 10 million copies in the United States.

American Music Awards
The American Music Awards is an annual awards ceremony created by Dick Clark in 1973. Van Halen has received nine nominations, winning just once in 1992.

|-
| align="center"|  ||Van Halen|| Favorite Pop/Rock Band/Duo/Group || 
|-
|-
| align="center" rowspan="2" |  ||Van Halen|| Favorite Pop/Rock Band/Duo/Group || 
|-
|-
|5150|| Favorite Pop/Rock Album || 
|-
|-
| align="center" rowspan="2" |  || rowspan="2"| Van Halen ||Favorite Heavy Metal/Hard Rock Artist || 
|-
|-
| Favorite Pop/Rock Band/Duo/Group || 
|-
|-
| align="center"|  ||OU812|| Favorite Heavy Metal/Hard Rock Album || 
|-
|-
| align="center" rowspan="2" |  ||For Unlawful Carnal Knowledge|| Favorite Heavy Metal/Hard Rock Album || 
|-
|-
|Van Halen|| Best Heavy Metal/Hard Rock Artist || 
|-
| align="center"|  ||Van Halen|| Best Heavy Metal/Hard Rock Artist || 
|-

Grammy Awards
The Grammy Awards are awarded annually by the National Academy of Recording Arts and Sciences. Van Halen has received five nominations, winning just once in 1992.

|-
| Rowspan="2" | 1985
| "Jump"
| Best Rock Performance by a Duo or Group with Vocal
| 
|-
| "Donut City" (Edward Van Halen)
| Best Rock Instrumental Performance
| 
|-
| 1992
| For Unlawful Carnal Knowledge
| Best Hard Rock Performance
| 
|-
| 1996
| "The Seventh Seal"
| Best Hard Rock Performance
| 
|-
| 1997
| "Respect The Wind" (Edward & Alex Van Halen)
| Best Rock Instrumental Performance
| 
|}

MTV Video Music Awards
The MTV Video Music Awards is an annual awards ceremony established in 1984 by MTV. Van Halen has received 11 nominations, winning four times.

|-
| rowspan="3" | 1984
| rowspan="3" | "Jump"
| Best Group Video
| 
|-
| Best Stage Performance in a Video
| 
|-
| Best Overall Performance in a Video
| 
|-
| 1989
| "Finish What Ya Started"
| Best Direction in a Video (Director: Andy Morahan)
| 
|-
| rowspan="7" | 1992
| rowspan="7" | "Right Now"
| Video of the Year
| 
|-
| Best Group Video
| 
|-
| Best Metal/Hard Rock Video
| 
|-
| Breakthrough Video
| 
|-
| Best Direction in a Video (Director: Mark Fenske)
| 
|-
| Best Editing in a Video (Editor: Mitchell Sinoway)
| 
|-
| Viewer's Choice
| 
|}

Awards
Van Halen